Luszyca  is a village in the administrative district of Gmina Połaniec, within Staszów County, Świętokrzyskie Voivodeship in south-central Poland. The village has a population of 28.

Demography 
According to the 2002 Poland census, there were 29 people residing in Luszyca village, of whom 62.1% were male and 37.9% were female. In the village, the population was spread out with 10.3% under the age of 18, 31% from 18 to 44, 34.5% from 45 to 64, and 24.1% who were 65 years of age or older.
 Figure 1. Population pyramid of village in 2002 — by age group and sex

References

Luszyca